Val Marie is a village in the Canadian province of Saskatchewan within the Rural Municipality of Val Marie No. 17 and Census Division 4. It is about 30 kilometres from the Canada-United States border.

Considered the gateway to the Grasslands National Park, Val Marie's economy is largely based on wheat farming, ranching, and tourism. Some natural gas has been found nearby. Employment includes agriculture, federal government (Grasslands National Park and Canadian Border Services), tourism (hotel and accommodation, restaurant, retail, etc) and a significant natural gas compressor relay station at the Montana border.

Etymology
Fr. Louis-Pierre Gravel, missionary and promoter of much French Catholic immigration to southwestern Saskatchewan, originally called this settlement Rivière des Français after the nearby Frenchman River. For an unknown reason, he proposed a different name in a 1911 report to the superintendent of immigration: Libreval ("Free Valley"). Ultimately, neither of Gravel's suggestions were used, and Val Marie ("Valley of Mary"), was coined by Fr. Claude Passaplan, missionary priest in the area. Before coming to Val Marie, Passaplan served as the first Roman Catholic parish priest in Swift Current.

History 
The first European investigation of the area was conducted by the Palliser Expedition (1857–1859), supported by the Royal Geographical Society and the British Government, and led by John Palliser, a wealthy Irish landowner. He was accompanied by geologist James Hector, and various cartographers and botanists. They studied the natural resources and agricultural potential of the Palliser area – including Val Marie – and reported the place as dismally dry, prone to drought, and unfit for habitation. The dismissive conclusions slowed settlement in the area for decades.

Artifacts of native civilization are significant. In 1877, Tatanka Iyotake – Sitting Bull – crossed from the USA into Canada along the Frenchman River (which flows through Val Marie) after his victory over General Custer at Battle of the Little Bighorn.

The community of Val Marie – Valley of Mary – was founded in 1910 by Father Passaplan, Louis Denniel, and the brothers François and Léon Pinel. Most of the early settlers were ranchers and farmers from Quebec and France. Val Marie was incorporated as a village on September 13, 1926. By 1939, two irrigation reservoirs were built near Val Marie by the PFRA (Prairie Farm Rehabilitation Agency) in coordination with Ducks Unlimited. Over  are irrigated through the system which provides some stabilization through droughts that plague the area.

Originally settled by French ranchers, the village remained largely ethnically French and by the 1950s had 450 people. Amenities then included three gasoline stations, a hospital, convent, bakery, bank, and several cafes and stores.  The population declined significantly with low grain commodity prices and droughts in the 1980s. English is now universally spoken as the last unilingual Francophone resident died in 1981.  The Grasslands National Park has attracted some new people into the area; full-time and seasonal employees for the park, as well as recent retirees now call Val Marie home.

On August 14, 2004, Grasslands – Where Heaven Meets Earth, a site-specific art performance, was held in the community and park.  The event was a collaboration of Canadian artists including Bill Coleman, Edward Poitras, Gordon Monahan, and Margie Gillis.

Geography

Grasslands National Park 
The West Block of Grasslands National Park lies 10 km east of Val Marie. The park is the only place in Canada where black-tailed prairie dog colonies are found. In 2006, plains bison were re-introduced into the park.  Hiking in the badlands and viewing wildlife in the park are primary visiting activities. The park is divided into two blocks. The West Block is closest to Val Marie and the East Block is near Killdeer, SK. There are no plans to connect the two blocks. The West Block near Val Marie will be about 450 square kilometres when complete. It protects the Frenchman River Valley and is home to many unique species in Canada such as Plains Bison, Prairie Rattlesnake, Black-tailed Prairie Dogs, Burrowing Owls, Swift Fox, and many more. An official Parks Canada information centre is located in the town of Val Marie.

The park is home to over 12,000 teepee rings, indicating that the land was heavily used by indigenous people before it was used by cattle ranchers and homesteading. Primarily the Plains Cree and the Assiniboine used the land to hunt bison. The large 76 Ranch once had an office and many sections of land in the Val Marie area.

Dark Sky Preserve 
In 2009, Grasslands National Park was designated as a Dark Sky Preserve by the Royal Astronomical Society of Canada. Grasslands National Park has worked with the Village of Val Marie and SaskPower to practice dark sky friendly lighting. Street lights in the town are aimed down to prevent unnecessary light from going into sky. The goal of this is to provide the best habitat possible for wildlife and nocturnal species. It also makes the area an ideal place for astronomy, stargazing and astro-photography. Astronomy events take place in the park annually. There is a "Clear Sky Clock" set up to provide cloud cover forecasts.

Climate 
Located within Palliser's Triangle, Val Marie has a semi-arid climate (Köppen climate classification BSk). Val Marie has a weather station with daily records since 1937. It can be a harsh climate, cold and windswept in the winter and often very dry for prolonged periods, broken sometimes by extremely intense rainfalls during the summer. Val Marie is sometimes the national hotspot in Canada on a given summer day. Val Marie gets more days of sunlight per year than anywhere else in Canada. On average, Val Marie receives  of precipitation per year and about two thirds of that is snow.

The record one-day snowfall is  April 2, 1940.

Demographics

The village recorded its largest population in 1961, when 443 people lived in Val Marie.

Culture 
Val Marie holds many annual events such as the Val Marie Bob Larson Memorial Rodeo, Lion's Senior's Supper, Lion's Sports Day, and a Canada Day parade, among others. Between the Val Marie Hotel, Prairie Wind & Silver Sage (the museum), theatre/hall, and arena, there are many events taking place weekly.

Heritage buildings
Val Marie is home to two municipally declared heritage buildings. 
 The Val Marie School. It is an old two-room schoolhouse made of red brick that was used from 1927-1985. The building is now maintained by Prairie Wind & Silver Sage - Friends of Grasslands National Park (PWSS). It is used as a seasonal museum, gift shop, coffee shop, and art gallery. A self-guided Val Marie walking tour is available through PWSS.
 The Val Marie Elevator. Built in 1927, this elevator has wood paneling and cedar shingles. A local community group has been actively fundraising for its restoration with the anticipation of turning it into a museum. The outside has been completely restored, and work has commenced on the interior.

Tourism
In 2018, Grasslands National Park had almost 20,000 visitors through the park, in cooperation with the Canada 150 Marketing campaign. The number of tourists that come to Val Marie for annual events or to use the Port of Monchy Border Crossing is unknown.

The Village of Val Marie has partnered with the Cypress Hills Destination Area to promote Val Marie as a tourist destination.

Services in the community include a gas station, a hotel/bar, a museum (which also includes a gift shop, coffee shop and art gallery), a café, a campground, art galleries, bed and breakfasts, an old convent that has been converted to an inn, a movie theatre, yoga studio, a hockey arena and curling rink, a library, a community centre, a town square, and a community-owned grocery store. Some services are only available seasonally. Val Marie is also home to a school (kindergarten to grade 12) and the Val Marie Early Learning Centre which offers preschool programming. A basic life support ambulance services the region. The nearest full-service centre is the city of Swift Current, located 120 km north on Highway 4.

Recreation
Arena: Hockey and curling are popular activities during the winter

Community Centre: cards, sewing, pancake breakfasts, art classes

Yoga: Val Marie is home to two yoga studios

Art: Millie's Art Gallery has art classes available

Hiking and walking: Local walking trails and routes are available in Val Marie in addition to Grasslands National Park

Birdwatching: Watch for migratory birds in the spring and fall, and breeding birds during the summer.

Canoeing and kayaking: The Val Marie Reservoir/ Newton Lake

Boating and fishing: The Val Marie Reservoir/ Newton Lake

Hunting: Big game, game birds and migratory bird hunting are all popular in Val Marie.

Snowshoeing and cross-country skiing: May be available in the winter depending on snowfall.

Theatre: Weekly movies are played throughout the tourist season

Notable people
Oneil Carlier – Alberta Minister of Agriculture, 2015-2019
Will James – Quebec cowboy novelist/artist; lived in area 1910-1913
Ron Miksha – author; geophysicist; lived in Val Marie 1976-1987
Bryan Trottier – former NHL player/coach, seven-time Stanley Cup champion, Hockey Hall of Fame
Rocky Trottier – former NHL player, drafted 8th overall in 1982

Further reading
Lynch, Wayne (1984). Married to the Wind: A Study of the Prairie Grasslands.
Miksha, Ron (2004). Bad Beekeeping.
Salloum, Habeeb (2010). Bison Delights: Middle Eastern Western Cookbook.
Stav, Jean (2000). A Barefoot Boy from Val Marie.
Stegner, Wallace (1955). Wolf Willow.

References

External links

Villages in Saskatchewan
Val Marie No. 17, Saskatchewan
Division No. 4, Saskatchewan